Lövheim Cube of Emotion is a theoretical model for the relationship between the monoamine neurotransmitters serotonin, dopamine and noradrenaline and emotions. The model was presented in 2012 by Swedish researcher Hugo Lövheim.  

Lövheim classifies emotions according to Silvan Tomkins, and orders the basic emotions in a three-dimensional coordinate system where the level of the monoamine neurotransmitters form orthogonal axes. The model is regarded as a dimensional model of emotion.

The main concepts of the hypothesis are that the monoamine neurotransmitters are orthogonal in essence, and the proposed one-to-one relationship between the monoamine neurotransmitters and emotions.

References 

Psychology articles needing expert attention
Emotion
Mathematical psychology
Affective science